The Missinabi Formation is a Late Pleistocene geologic formation in Ontario. It preserves fossils of mastodon.

See also 
 List of fossiliferous stratigraphic units in Ontario

References

Further reading 
 C. R. Harington. 1990. Vertebrates of the Last Interglaciation in Canada: A Review, with New Data. Geographie physique et Quaternaire 44(3)

Geologic formations of Ontario
Pleistocene Canada
Paleontology in Ontario